Parliamentary elections were held in Finland on 1 and 2 July 1939. Following the elections, the National Progressive Party-led government of Aimo Cajander continued in office. However, he was replaced by Risto Ryti's Progressive-led war government in December 1939.

Background
The leading issues were the distribution of the growing prosperity's benefits, the prospects for the centre-left coalition government's continuation, the right-wing opposition's criticism of the government's numerous and allegedly poorly prepared legislative proposals, and the Finnish national security under the threat of World War II. Prime Minister Cajander opposed the notable increase of defence spending before the elections, because that would require raising taxes. Finance Minister Väinö Tanner and Governor of the Bank of Finland, Risto Ryti, opposed the taking of a foreign loan to buy modern military equipment for the Finnish army, although the Finnish national debt in 1939 was among the lowest in the Western world.  Most Finnish voters were apparently satisfied with the centre-left Cajander government's performance, because it received almost three-quarters of the seats.  The voter turnout was the highest of the Finnish parliamentary elections of the 1920s and 1930s.

Results

References

General elections in Finland
Finland
Parliament
Finland
Election and referendum articles with incomplete results